VA-93 may refer to:
VA-93 (U.S. Navy)
State Route 93 (Virginia)